Honey Camp Lagoon is a freshwater lagoon in Belize. The lagoon is located in the district of Orange Walk and is approximately 9 miles away from the nearest town Orange Walk Town. The surrounding area of the lagoon is mostly undeveloped properties which are privately owned. The water in the lagoon is clear and has a maximum depth of thirty feet, with a bottom being lined with decomposed limestone .

History
The lagoon was once inhabited by the Maya civilization in the Postclassic Era (A.D. 900 to 1500 ). Archaeologists over the years have had many discoveries throughout the lagoon which have revealed evidence of the Maya civilization. On the largest island found in the lagoon, a shrine was discovered that demonstrates the recreation and survival of ancient Maya customs of ancestor worship and rain-god ceremonies. Archaeologists refer to Honey Camp Lagoon as "Laguna de on". The lagoon is currently popular among locals and tourists.

Research studies 

Studies began in 1926 with Thomas Gann who discovered effigy ceramics from "pavement" located on the large island surface. The lagoon was also visited by Clement Meighan and James Bennyhoff in the 1950s where they discovered lithic artifacts. In 1980 Thomas Kelly and John Masson also visited the site. Dr. Marilyn Masson also visited the site in 1996 and made discoveries of her own.

References 

 Masson, M. A.(2014). In the Realm of Nachan Kan: Postclassic Maya Archaeology at Laguna De On, Belize. Boulder: University Press of Colorado. Retrieved September 17, 2016, from Project MUSE database.
 Masson, M. A. (1997). Cultural Transformation at the Maya Postclassic Community of Laguna de On, Belize. Latin American Antiquity, 8(4), 293. doi:10.2307/972105 Retrieved September 17, 2016
 Belize's Island Maya. (1997, January). Earthwatch: The Journal of Earthwatch Institute, 16(1), 1-31. Retrieved September 17, 2016.
 Honey Camp Ranch. (2013). Retrieved September 17, 2016, from https://www.travelbelize.org/honey-camp-ranch
 Northern Belize - Honey Camp Lagoon of the Orange Walk District, Belize. (n.d.). Retrieved September 17, 2016, from http://www.northernbelize.com/see_hclagoon.html
 Honey Camp Ranch About. (n.d.). Retrieved September 17, 2016, from http://honeycampranch.com/hcA.htm
 5 Must-Dos in Orange Walk. (n.d.). Retrieved September 17, 2016, from https://belizetourismboard.org/works/5-must-dos-in-orange-walk/

Lagoons of North America
Geography of Belize
Orange Walk District